Trombone For Two is a 1956 album by jazz trombonists  J. J. Johnson and Kai Winding ("Jay and Kai"). It was the first of five albums that Winding and Johnson recorded for Columbia Records (CL 742).  George Avakian produced the recording sessions, which took place on June 23 and 24, 1955.

In 2007, Mosaic Records paired the album with Jay and Kai (Columbia CL 973) on one compact disc (MCD-1015), as part of the label's Mosaic Singles series.


Reception 

Scott Yanow, writing for allmusic, describes Trombone For Two as "bop-based but full of surprises, tasteful but not always predictable," and gives the album a three-star rating (of a possible five). It was a surprise success in the '50s, when jazz was dominated by piano trios and trumpet and tenor saxophone stars. Jay and Kai crafted well thought out, inventive arrangements that highlighted the blend of their sounds while at the same time setting off their distinctive styles.

Track listing
Side One
1. "The Whiffenpoof Song" (Minnigerode-Pomeroy-Galloway-Rev: R. Vallee)
2. "Give Me the Simple Life" (Ruby - Bloom)
3. "Close as Pages in a Book" (Fields - Romberg)
4. "Turnabout" (J. J. Johnson)
5. "Trombone for Two" (Kai Winding)
Side Two
6. "It's Sand, Man" (E. Lewis-Arr: K. Winding)
7. "We Two" (J. J. Johnson)
8. "Let's Get Away From It All" (Adair-Dennis)
9. "Goodbye" (Jenkins)
10. "This Can't Be Love" (Rodgers and Hart)

Personnel
 J.J. Johnson - Trombone
 Kai Winding - Trombone
 Dick Katz - Piano
 Paul Chambers - Bass
 Osie Johnson - Drums

References 

1956 albums
Columbia Records albums
Kai Winding albums
J. J. Johnson albums
Albums produced by George Avakian
Mosaic Records albums